George Horne Russell (or G. Horne Russell by which he was known)  (April 18, 1861 – June 25, 1933) was a Scottish-born Canadian painter.

Career
Born in Banff, Aberdeenshire, Scotland, he studied at the Aberdeen School of Art and the South Kensington School of Art. He came to Canada in 1889 on invitation, settling in Montreal where he established a studio and painted portraits of many noted and well-to-do Canadians. By 1900 he was painting large scenes of the Rockies for the Canadian Pacific Railway. He was a close friend of Sir William Van Horne. It was probably Van Horne along with other wealthy Montrealers
who vacationed annually at St. Andrews, N.B., who persuaded Russell to locate a summer home and studio there.

In 1926 in Montreal he held his first solo show at the Watson Art Gallery. He was considered a major maritime painter. His work is included in the following collections: National Gallery of Canada; the Glenbow-Alberta Institute; the Art Gallery of Ontario, and in many other public and private collections, including the Canadian Club, New York. From 1922 to 1926, he was the president of the Royal Canadian Academy of Arts.

References

1861 births
1933 deaths
19th-century Canadian painters
20th-century Canadian painters
Artists from Montreal
Canadian male painters
People from Banff, Aberdeenshire
Scottish emigrants to Canada
Members of the Royal Canadian Academy of Arts
19th-century Canadian male artists
20th-century Canadian male artists